Planik is an uninhabited Croatian island in the Adriatic Sea located east of Olib.

The island is 4 km long, and the widest part is 800 m wide and covered with macchia. The nearby residents from Olib kept sheep all the year.

References

Islands of the Adriatic Sea
Islands of Croatia
Uninhabited islands of Croatia
Landforms of Zadar County